The Duke Wore Jeans is a 1958 British comedy musical film by producer Nat Cohen starring Tommy Steele and June Laverick.

The songs for the film were released in 1958 by Decca on a 10" LP, a 7" EP and two 7" singles and, in more recent times, on compilation CDs.

Plot
The only son of the poor but aristocratic Whitecliffe family is to be sent to the nation of Ritalla in order to sell the family's cattle to upgrade the nation's livestock.  As a side benefit, his parents hope he will marry the King's only daughter, Princess Maria.  Unknown to his family, Tony is already secretly married to a commoner.  Fate intervenes when drifter Tommy Hudson, who is the identical likeness of Tony, comes to the Whitecliffe estate to seek work. Tony engages Tommy to impersonate him on his trip to Ritalla accompanied by Cooper, the family's only servant.

Tommy and Cooper travel to Ritalla where Tommy pretends to be Tony. The princess refuses to meet him because she does not want to get married. Meanwhile, Prime Minister Bastini is scheming to force the King to abdicate since his daughter refuses to marry.

Tommy meets the princess and they fall in love.

Cast
 Tommy Steele as Tony Whitecliffe / Tommy Hudson
 June Laverick as Princess Maria
 Michael Medwin as Cooper
 Eric Pohlmann as Bastini - Prime Minister
 Alan Wheatley as King of Ritalla
 Noel Hood as Lady Marguerite
 Mary Kerridge as Queen
 Elwyn Brook-Jones as Bartolomeo
 Ambrosine Phillpotts as Duchess Cynthia Whitecliffe
 Clive Morton as Lord Edward Whitecliffe

Production
Steele made the film because he was contracted to Nat Cohen and Stuart Levy for one more movie. He says the idea of the film was his, as he always liked The Prince and the Pauper. "It wasn't only a chance to act a bit, it was also an opportunity to kick around new musical ideas," he wrote later. "I wanted to act a good part and sing show numbers."

Steele was paid £20,000 plus 10% of the profits.

Producer Peter Rogers says he found Steele "vain, conceited, bad mannered and the biggest crime of all, unprofessional." Bart pitched Rogers the idea of making a version of Oliver Twist starring Steele but Rogers did not want to work with the singer again.The producer claims he told Bart to turn the idea into a stage musical which led to Oliver!.

Songs
The songs in the film included:
"It's All Happening"
"What do You Do"
"Family Tree"
"Happy Guitar"
"Hair-Down, Hoe-Down"
"Princess"
"Photograph" (duet with June Laverick)
"Thanks A Lot"

All of the songs were written by Lionel Bart, Mike Pratt and Jimmy Bennett (a pseudonym of Tommy Steele).

Steele said "Family Tree" in particular "proved Lionel Bart's talent as a wordsmith...  It was a bastard to sing but I relished it."

Soundtrack

Chart positions

References

Notes

External links 
 
The Duke Wore Jeans at BFI
The Duke Wore Jeans at Letterbox DVD
Review of film at Variety
Review of film at Spinning Image

1958 films
1958 comedy films
1950s English-language films
Films directed by Gerald Thomas
British comedy films
Films produced by Peter Rogers
Films with screenplays by Norman Hudis
Films shot at British National Studios
1950s British films